Halfway Lake may refer to:

In Canada
Halfway Lake, Alberta, a locality in Alberta
Halfway Lake (Nova Scotia), a lake of Halifax Regional Municipality
Halfway Lake Provincial Park, in Sudbury District in northeastern Ontario

In the United States
Halfway Lake (Pennsylvania), a lake in Hartley Township, Union County
Halfway Lake National Wildlife Refuge, in North Dakota